The Buyskes class was a class of two hydrographic survey vessels that were part of the Dutch Hydrographic Service of the Royal Netherlands Navy. Together with  the ships of this class were the main ships of the Dutch Hydrographic Service during the last quarter of the 20th century. While the ships of the Buyskes class were built for performing hydrographic research, the Tydeman was focused on oceanography.

Design and construction
They were equipped with the automated "Hydraut" system that allowed them to perform hydrographic measuring. The data this system gathered was used to make detailed maps. However, in comparison to Tydeman the Buyskes-class ships were deemed less modern.

The Buyskes undertook her sea trials in January 1973, while the Blommendal did her sea trials in April 1973. In the same year both ships were taken into service of the Royal Netherlands Navy.

Service history
The ships were  active in the North Sea.

Ships in class

Notes

Citations

References
 
 
 

Survey ships
Survey vessels of the Royal Netherlands Navy